Banteay Srei or Banteay Srey is a 10th-century Cambodian temple dedicated to the Hindu god Shiva. Banteay Srei is built largely of red sandstone, a medium that lends itself to the elaborate decorative wall carvings which are still observable today. The buildings themselves are miniature in scale, unusually so when measured by the standards of Angkorian construction. These factors have made the temple extremely popular with tourists, and have led to its being widely praised as a "precious gem", or the "jewel of Khmer art."

History

Foundation and dedication

Consecrated on 22 April 967 A.D., Bantãy Srĕi was the only major temple at Angkor not built by a monarch; its construction is credited to the courtiers named Vishnukumara and Yajnavaraha / Yajñavarāha (modern ), who served as a counsellor to king Rajendravarman II (modern ). The foundational stela says that Yajnavaraha, grandson of king Harsavarman I, was a scholar and philanthropist who helped those who suffered from illness, injustice, or poverty. His pupil was the future king Jayavarman V (r. 968- ca. 1001). Originally, the temple was surrounded by a town called Īśvarapura.

Yajñavarāha's temple was primarily dedicated to the Hindu god Śiva. Originally, it carried the name Tribhuvanamaheśvara—great lord of the threefold world—in reference to the Shaivite linga that served as its central religious image.  However, the temple buildings appear to be divided along the central east–west axis between those buildings located south of the axis, which are devoted to Śiva, and those north of the axis, which are devoted to Viṣṇu.

The temple's modern name, Bantãy Srĕi—citadel of the women, or citadel of beauty—is probably related to the intricacy of the bas relief carvings found on the walls and the tiny dimensions of the buildings themselves.  Some have speculated that it relates to the many devatas carved into the walls of the buildings.

Expansion and rededication
Bantãy Srĕi was subject to further expansion and rebuilding work in the eleventh century.  At some point it came under the control of the king and had its original dedication changed; the inscription K 194 from Phnoṃ Sandak, dated Monday, the 14th or 28 July 1119 A.D. records (line B 13) the temple being given to the priest Divākarapaṇḍita and being rededicated to Śiva.  It remained in use at least until the fourteenth century according to the last known inscription K 569, dated Thursday, 8 August 1303 A.D.

Restoration
The temple was rediscovered in 1914 and was the subject of a celebrated case of art theft when André Malraux stole four devatas in 1923. (He was soon arrested, and the figures were returned.) The incident stimulated interest in the site, which was cleared the following year.

In the 1930s Banteay Srei was restored through the first important use of anastylosis at Angkor whereby a ruined building or monument is restored using the original architectural elements to the greatest degree possible. Until the discovery of the foundation stela in 1936, it had been assumed that the extreme decoration indicated a later date than was the case.

To prevent the site from water damage, the joint Cambodian-Swiss Banteay Srei Conservation Project installed a drainage system between 2000 and 2003. Measures were also taken to prevent damage to the temples walls from nearby trees.

Unfortunately, the temple has been ravaged by pilfering and vandalism. When, toward the end of the 20th century, authorities removed some original statues and replaced them with concrete replicas, looters took to attacking the replicas. A statue of Shiva and his shakti Uma, removed to the National Museum in Phnom Penh for safekeeping, was assaulted in the museum itself.

Materials and style
Banteay Srei is built largely of a hard red sandstone that can be carved like wood.  Brick and laterite were used only for the enclosure walls and some structural elements. The temple is known for the beauty of its sandstone lintels and pediments.

A pediment is the roughly triangular space above a rectangular doorway or openings. At Banteay Srei, pediments are relatively large in comparison to the openings below, and take a sweeping gabled shape.   For the first time in the history of Khmer architecture, whole scenes of mythological subject-matter are depicted on the pediments.

A lintel is a horizontal beam spanning the gap between two posts. Some lintels serve a structural purpose, serving to support the weight of the superstructure, while others are purely decorative in purpose. The lintels at Banteay Srei are beautifully carved, rivalling those of the 9th century Preah Ko style in quality.

Noteworthy decorative motifs include the kala (a toothy monster symbolic of time), the guardian dvarapala (an armed protector of the temple) and devata (demi-goddess), the false door, and the colonette.  Indeed, decorative carvings seem to cover almost every available surface. According to pioneering Angkor scholar Maurice Glaize, "Given the very particular charm of Banteay Srei – its remarkable state of preservation and the excellence of a near perfect ornamental technique – one should not hesitate, of all the monuments of the Angkor group, to give it the highest priority."  At Banteay Srei, wrote Glaize, "the work relates more closely to the art of the goldsmith or to carving in wood than to sculpture in stone".

The site

The site consists of three concentric rectangular enclosures constructed on an east–west axis. A causeway situated on the axis leads from an outer gopura, or gate, to the third or outermost of the three enclosures. The inner enclosure contains the sanctuary, consisting of an entrance chamber and three towers, as well as two buildings conventionally referred to as libraries.

The outer gopura
The gopura is all that remains of the outer wall surrounding the town of Isvapura. The wall is believed to have measured approximately 500 m square, and may have been constructed of wood. The gopura's eastern pediment shows Indra, who was associated with that direction, mounted on his three-headed elephant Airavata. The 67 m causeway with the remains of corridors on either side connects the gopura with the third enclosure. North and south of this causeway are galleries with a north–south orientation.

The third (outer) enclosure

The third enclosure is 95 by 110 m; it is surrounded by a laterite wall breached by gopuras at the eastern and western ends.  Neither pediment of the eastern gopura is in situ. The west-facing pediment is now located in the Musée Guimet in Paris. It depicts a scene from the Mahabhārata in which the Asura brothers Sunda and Upasunda fight over the Apsara Tilottama. The east-facing pediment is lying on the ground. It depicts a scene from the Rāmāyaṇa in which a demon seizes Rama's wife Sita.  Most of the area within the third enclosure is occupied by a moat divided into two parts by causeways to the east and west.

The second enclosure

The second enclosure sits between an outer laterite wall measuring 38 by 42 m, with gopuras at the eastern and western ends, and a brick inner enclosure wall, measuring 24 by 24 m. The western gopura features an interesting bas relief depicting the duel of the monkey princes Vāli and Sugriva, as well as Rāma's intervention on Sugrīva's behalf. The inner enclosure wall has collapsed, leaving a gopura at the eastern end and a brick shrine at the western. The eastern pediment of the gopura shows Śiva Nataraja; the west-facing pediment has an image of Karaikal Ammaiyar, one of the three women saints amongst the sixty three Nayanmars (hounds of Śiva). Likewise, the laterite galleries which once filled the second enclosure (one each to north and south, two each to east and west) have partially collapsed. A pediment on one of the galleries shows the lion-man Narasiṃha clawing the demon Hiranyakashipu.

The first (inner) enclosure
Between the gopuras on the collapsed inner wall are the buildings of the inner enclosure: a library in the south-east corner and another in the north-east corner, and in the centre the sanctuary set on a T-shaped platform 0.9 m high. Besides being the most extravagantly decorated parts of the temple, these have also been the most successfully restored (helped by the durability of their sandstone and their small scale). In 2010, the first enclosure is open to visitors again, but the inner temples are roped off and inaccessible.

The libraries

The two libraries are of brick, laterite and sandstone. Each library has two pediments, one on the eastern side and one on the western. According to Maurice Glaize, the four library pediments, "representing the first appearance of tympanums with scenes, are works of the highest order. Superior in composition to any which followed, they show true craftsmanship in their modelling in a skilful blend of stylisation and realism."

The east-facing pediment on the southern library shows Śiva seated on the summit of Mount Kailāsa, his mythological abode. His consort Umā sits on his lap and clings anxiously to his torso. Other beings are also present on the slopes of the mountain, arranged in a strict hierarchy of three tiers from top to bottom. In the top tier sit bearded wise men and ascetics, in the middle tier mythological figures with the heads of animals and the bodies of humans, and in the bottom tier large animals, including a number of lions. In the middle of the scene stands the ten-headed demon king Rāvaṇa. He is shaking the mountain in its very foundations as the animals flee from his presence and as the wise men and mythological beings discuss the situation or pray. According to the legend, Śiva stopped Rāvaṇa from shaking the mountain by using his toe to press down on the mountain and to trap Rāvana underneath for 1000 years.

The west-facing pediment on southern library shows Śiva again seated on the summit of Mount Kailāsa. He is looking to his left at the god of love Kāma, who is aiming an arrow at him. Umā sits to Śiva's right; he is handing her a chain of beads. The slopes of the mountain are crowded with other beings, again arranged in a strict hierarchy from top to bottom. Just under Śiva sits a group of bearded wise men and ascetics, under whom the second tier is occupied by the mythological beings with the heads of animals and the bodies of humans; the lowest tier belongs the common people, who mingle sociably with tame deer and a large gentle bull. According to the legend, Kāma fired an arrow at Śiva in order to cause Śiva to take an interest in Umā. Śiva, however, was greatly angered by this provocation, and punished Kāma by gazing upon him with his third eye, frying Kāma to cinders.

The east-facing pediment on the northern library shows the god of the sky Indra creating rain to put out a forest fire started by the god of fire Agni for purposes of killing the nāga king Takshaka who lived in Khandava Forest. The Mahābhāratan heroes Kṛṣṇa and Arjuna are shown helping Agni by firing a dense hail of arrows to block Indra's rain. Takṣaka's son Aśvasena is depicted attempting to escape from the conflagration, while other animals stampede about in panic.

The west-facing pediment on the northern library depicts Kṛṣṇa slaying his wicked uncle Kamsa.

The sanctuary
The sanctuary is entered from the east by a doorway only 1.08 m in height: inside is an entrance chamber (or maṇḍapa) with a corbelled brick roof, then a short corridor leading to three towers to the west: the central tower is the tallest, at 9.8 m. Glaize notes the impression of delicacy given the towers by the antefixes on each of their tiers. The six stairways leading up to the platform were each guarded by two kneeling statues of human figures with animal heads; most of those now in place are replicas, the originals having been stolen or removed to museums.

See also
 Angkor
 Architecture of Cambodia

References

Bibliography
 
 Cœdès, George / Dupont, Pierre: «Les stèles de Sdŏk Kăk Thoṃ, Phnoṃ Sandak et Práḥ Vihằr», BEFEO XLIII, 1943, pp. 56–154.
 Finot, Louis / Parmentier, Henri / Goloubew, Victor: Le temple d’Īçvarapura, Paris: G. Vanoest 1926 (Mémoires archéologiques I).
 
 Glaize, Maurice (2003 edition of an English translation of the 1993 French fourth edition).  The Monuments of the Angkor Group. Retrieved 14 July 2005.
 Higham, Charles (2001).  The Civilization of Angkor. Phoenix. .
 Inscriptions du Cambodge Éditées et traduites par G[eorge] Cœdès. Vol. I, Hanoi 1937
 Jessup, Helen Ibbetson (2004).  Art & Architecture of Cambodia. Thames & Hudson. pp. 99–104.
 Polkinghorne, Martin (2008). Khmer decorative lintels and the allocation of artistic labour, in Arts Asiatiques 63: 21–35.  
 Roveda, Vittorio (1997). Khmer Mythology: Secrets of Angkor. New York: Weatherhill.  (This work should be used with caution. While it is thorough in its treatment of Angkorian representational art, and contains many useful photographs, it is sometimes inaccurate in its characterization of the underlying Indian myths, and does not reflect a thorough investigation of sources for those myths.)

External links

  APSARA Authority. Banteay Srei
  
 German Angkor Imagery Project: Banteay Srei
 Banteay Srei Photo Gallery

Hindu temples in Siem Reap Province
Angkorian sites in Siem Reap Province